Adim Williams is Nigerian film director best known for his work on the Abuja Connection trilogy of films.

He has worked extensively in the Nollywood film industry since 2002, directing some 28 pictures by the end of 2006.

His film Joshua was the first Nollywood production ever to be introduced into the American DVD market, released in December 2005. He's among the notable movie actor featured in the movie "The Interview".

Adim Williams is a director and writer, known for Mr. Ibu in London (2004), Crying Angel (2005), and Valentino (2002).

Some of his movies

MR IBU IN LONDON

A poorly paid security guard who is always mocked hides inside a cargo container and finds himself on the homeless on the streets of London until surprisingly an old friend comes to his aid. Cast and crew Charles Okocha, Mr Ibu, Rita Johnson, John Okafor, Nkiru Ughanze, Remy Ohanjiyan, Ishola Oshun and more.

Filmography 
''Desperate sister
Too Late to Claim 2
Royal Battle 2
Millionaire's Daughter
Women in Power
Temple of Justice 2

References

External links
 

Year of birth missing (living people)
Nigerian film directors
Nigerian entertainment industry businesspeople
Nigerian screenwriters
Living people